What We Been Doin is the eighth studio album by American rapper B-Legit, released through Empire Distribution on April 14, 2015

Track listing
"M.O.B. (Money Over Bullshit)" (featuring Ocky Ocky) - 3:34
"Loaded" (featuring Ted DiGTL, Ocky Ocky, & Taj-He-Spitz) - 3:57
"Gud Gud (Like me)" (featuring J. Banks, Richie Rich, & Ted DiGTL) - 5:21
"What We Been Doin" (featuring E-40 & Ted DiGTL) 3:30
"Make a B*tch" (featuring Faith & Problem) - 2:30
"Marijuana" (featuring Berner) - 3:20
"Hella Bad" (featuring Cousin Fik) - 3:27
"Workout" (featuring E-40 & T2OAM) - 3:16
"Beast" (featuring Ted Digtl, Ocky Ocky, Taj-He-Spitz) - 3:39
"Wytb" (What You Talkin Bout) (featuring Clyde Carson) - 3:00
"Oh She" (featuring Marty JayR) 3:50
"Best Friend" (featuring J Boog) - 4:32

Personnel

 B-Legit - Primary Artist
 Berner - Featured Artist
 Joshua M. Blaxon - Producer
 Clyde Carson - Featured Artist
 Cosmo - Producer
 Cousin Fik - Featured Artist
 Ted Digtl - Featured Artist
 E-40 - Featured Artist 
 Faith - Featured Artist
 J Boog - Featured Artist
 J-Banks - Featured Artist
 Marty Jayr - Featured Artist
 Mekanix - Producer
 Ocky Ocky - Featured Artist
 Problem - Featured Artist
 Richie Rich - Featured Artist
 Maxwell Smart - Producer
 T20am - Featured Artist
 Taj-He-Spitz - Featured Artist

Charts

Weekly Charts

References

External links
 What We Been Doin lyrics

2015 albums
B-Legit albums
Empire Distribution albums